Rabbit School – Guardians of the Golden Egg is a 2017 German 3D computer-animated adventure comedy film directed by Ute von Münchow-Pohl from a screenplay by Katja Grübel and Dagmar Rehbinder, based on the 1924 German children's novel Die Häschenschule (A Day At Bunny School), written by Albert Sixtus and illustrated by Fritz Koch-Gotha. The film had its world premiere at the 67th Berlin International Film Festival in February 2017, and was released theatrically in Germany on 16 March 2017. It grossed $3,416,299 worldwide.

Premise 
Max, a young urban rabbit struggling with his identity, gets stuck in an old-fashioned Easter Rabbit school after it is surrounded by a clan of malicious foxes who want to take over the holiday. With the help of his crush Emmy and the instruction of the mysterious Madame Hermione, Max must learn the secret of the magic of the Easter bunnies and save the school from the evil foxes.

Release 
Rabbit School had its world premiere at the 67th Berlin International Film Festival in February 2017, and was released theatrically in Germany on 16 March 2017, distributed by Universum Film. During its opening week in Germany, the film received 103,518 admissions, and grossed a total of $1,603,605 during its entire German theatrical run, contributing to the worldwide gross of $3,416,299. International sales were handled by Sola Media.

Sequel 
A sequel, titled Rabbit Academy: Mission Eggpossible, was released in 2021.

References

External links 

Rabbit School – Guardians of the Golden Egg at filmportal.de (in German)

Rabbit School – Guardians of the Golden Egg at Radio Times

2017 films
2017 3D films
2017 animated films
2017 comedy films
3D animated films
2010s German animated films
2010s children's animated films
2010s children's comedy films
2010s children's adventure films
2010s German-language films
Animated comedy films
Animated films about animals
German animated films
German children's films
German comedy films
German adventure films
2010s German films